Momo (meaning: crumb) was the 10th king in the Tui Tonga dynasty of Tonga, who lived in the 11th or 12th century CE. He was named after one of the original gods of Tonga, a trio known as Kohai, Koau, mo Momo. The Tui Tonga maritime empire began to expand during his reign.

King Momo had his court in Heketā, near the village of Niutōua (doubly planted coconuttrees). His people were known as the Haa-mene-uli (dirty bottoms Clan), because in order to honour him they had to keep their heads lower than his, and thus shuffled around on their bottoms instead of their feet.

One day the king fell in love with a beautiful girl and sent his envoy, Lehauli, to her father, Loau, the Tui-Haamea (Haamea king) with a request for a yam for his plantation. Loau understood the real meaning of the request, and responded that he was unable to help as one yam was still immature and the other had already sprouted. He meant that his youngest daughter was still too young while his older daughter, Nua, had already had a child and was therefore an old woman. Her husband was Ngongo kilitoto from Malapo, chief of the Haangongo Clan( The clan of Ngongo).

The next day, Momo sent his envoy back to Loau with the words: Fena kā ko Nua (sprouted, but still it is Nua), and so Loau went to Malapo to ask Ngongokilitoto to give up his wife, which he did. Nua became Momo's wife, and their son became the greatest Tui Tonga of that period, Tuitātui. His elder stepbrother, Fasiapule, later became a kind of governor.

The location of Haamea is not certain. Some claim it was the centre of Tongatapu, near Matangiake, in which case Loau was only a minor prince. It is also possible that the name is a variant of Haamoa (Samoa), in which case Loau was also a powerful king, meaning the marriage story was a mythical way to represent the alliance between Tonga and Samoa, and the start of the empire, although the alliance would only last one generation.

References
 I.C. Campbell, Classical Tongan kingship, 1989
 E. Bott, Tonga society at the time of Captain Cook's visit, 1982
 O. Māhina, Images from the history and culture of Tonga, 2006

Tongan monarchs
History of Tonga
11th-century monarchs
12th-century monarchs